The Office of National Security assists the President of South Korea. It is led by a ministerial-level Director who is appointed by the President without nomination hearing at the legislature unlike other ministerial-level posts. Director often serves as the counterpart of National Security Advisor of the United States. Moreover, Director serves as the chairperson of the standing committee of National Security Council, which is established by Article 91 of the Constitution and chaired by the President, whilst its first Deputy Director serves as the Council's secretary-general.

History 
Similar organisation was established during Roh Moo-hyun administration but was abolished by Roh's successor, Lee Myung-bak. In 2013 the following Park Geun-hye administration established the Office to revive the organisation which oversees national security affairs and supports National Security Council. President Moon Jae-in restructured the Office and expanded its functions. Under President Moon, the first deputy dealt with security affairs whilst its second deputy foreign affairs and Inter-Korean relations. Under Moon's successor, Yoon Suk-yeol, deputies' roles have been reversed.

References 

Government agencies of South Korea